The 1970–71 WHL season was the 19th season of the Western Hockey League. Six teams played a 72-game schedule, and the Portland Buckaroos were the Lester Patrick Cup champions, defeating the Phoenix Roadrunners four games to one in the final series.

Art Jones of Portland led the league in scoring and was named the most valuable player.

Final Standings 

bold - qualified for playoffs

Playoffs 

The Portland Buckaroos defeated the Phoenix Roadrunnrers 4 games to 1 to win the Lester Patrick Cup.

References

Bibliography

 

Western Hockey League (1952–1974) seasons
1970–71 in American ice hockey by league
1970–71 in Canadian ice hockey by league